Heikendorf is a municipality in the district of Plön, in Schleswig-Holstein, Germany. It is a seaside resort off the Baltic Sea, located approximately 10 km from Kiel. The oldest part of the town is the Old Viking settlement in Möltenort.

Notable people linked with Heikendorf
 Adolf Dethmann (1896-1979) engineer and communist activist
 Robert Habeck (born 2 September 1969 in Lübeck) writer and politician of Alliance '90/The Greens
 Klaus-Dieter Flick (born 1937 in Germany) lawyer and financial broker, known as convicted Nazi art and military equipment collector from Kitzeberg, a wealthy suburb of Heikendorf

References

Seaside resorts in Germany
Plön (district)